Jackson Boulevard is a street in Chicago, in whose grid system it is 300 South. Named for President Andrew Jackson, it is adjacent to Van Buren Street named for Jackson's associate Martin Van Buren.

The Jackson Boulevard Bridge carries it across the Chicago River.

References

Streets in Chicago